Booher is an unincorporated community in Tyler County, West Virginia, United States, along Indian Creek. Its post office is closed.

The community takes its name from nearby Booher Creek.

References 

Unincorporated communities in West Virginia
Unincorporated communities in Tyler County, West Virginia